Ekoln constitutes the northernmost gulf of Lake Mälaren, Sweden. On its northern shore are the southern suburbs of Uppsala and the mouth of River Fyris.

In 2019, Ikea named a toilet brush after it.

References

Uppsala
Mälaren
Landforms of Uppsala County
Gulfs of Sweden